Jouette M. Bassler is an American biblical scholar and expert in Pauline theology who is Professor Emeritus of New Testament at Perkins School of Theology, Southern Methodist University. Her Ph.D. is from Yale University, and she taught at Georgetown University before moving to SMU. In 1979 Bassler was elected a member of the Catholic Biblical Association of America. She has written a number of books and served as general editor of the Journal of Biblical Literature from 1995 to 1999. She also served as New Testament editor for the HarperCollins Study Bible. Her 1994 article on the Pastoral Epistles has been "extremely influential in feminist interpretations." In 2007, a festschrift of nineteen essays was published in her honor.

Selected works

Books

Edited by

Chapters

Journal articles

References

20th-century biblical scholars
Year of birth missing (living people)
Bible commentators
New Testament scholars
Southern Methodist University faculty
Academic journal editors
Living people
American biblical scholars
Female biblical scholars